Leucanopsis cedon is a moth of the family Erebidae. It was described by Herbert Druce in 1897. It is found in Panama, Brazil, Peru, French Guiana, Venezuela, Ecuador and Bolivia.

References

 

cedon
Moths described in 1897